Yan Zong (颜宗) (1393-1459), courtesy name Xueyuan (学渊), was a native of Nanhai, Guangdong. His rank was Juren. He became a leader in the military in 1457 and a magistrate of Shaowu, Fujian in 1459. He was a famous painter during the Ming Dynasty and good at painting landscapes, which he learnt from Guo Xi, Li Cheng, Huang Gongwang, etc. Among the paintings he created was 'Lakes and Mountains Scenery Painting', etc.

Gallery

See also 

 List of Chinese painters
 Chinese painting

References

1393 births
1459 deaths
Chinese painters
Ming dynasty